MacLelan or McLelan is a surname. Notable people with the surname include:

Gloud Wilson McLelan (1796–1858), Canadian businessman and politician
Archibald McLelan, Canadian shipbuilder and politician

See also
MacLellan (surname)
McClellan (disambiguation)
McClelland